Nguyễn Trần Duy Nhất (born March 21, 1989) is a Vietnamese professional Muay Thai and Lethwei fighter.

Duy Nhất is a five-time WMF Muay Thai world champion and four-time SEA Games medalist in Muay Thai; in addition to having won medals at the IFMA World Muaythai Championships, Asian Indoor and Martial Arts Games, Asian Martial Arts Games, Asian Indoor Games, and Asian Beach Games.

Early life
Nguyễn Trần Duy Nhất was born in Nha Trang in the Khánh Hòa Province of Vietnam. He was then raised in Lam Dong in Vietnam's Central Highlands. Duy Nhất has one older sister and two younger brothers.

Being descended from the martial arts master who founded the Vietnamese martial art known as Tấn Gia Quyền, he began practicing martial arts from the age of 3. He then began competing in junior tournaments at the age of 14.

Duy Nhất discovered Muay Thai in 2007 when he left to study in Ho Chi Minh City. He first saw the martial art on the film Ong-Bak: Muay Thai Warrior.

Muay Thai career
Nguyễn Trần Duy Nhất made his first Muay Thai appearance at the 2009 Asian Martial Arts Games, competing in the men's featherweight division (54–57 kg). He lost 0–5 to Thailand's Kittisak Boonsemsen in the final to win the featherweight silver medal.

Duy Nhất then participated in the 2009 Asian Indoor Games, once more in the men's featherweight division. He beat Weerapol Nonting of Thailand, 4–1, in the final to win Vietnam's only gold medal in Muay Thai.

He would then make his SEA Games debut at the 2009 Southeast Asian Games held in Vientiane. Competing in the men's featherweight category, he finished in second place to win the silver medal.

On July 2, 2013, Nguyễn Trần Duy Nhất would defeat Daniiar Kashkaraev of Kyrgyzstan, 5–0, to win the gold medal in the men's featherweight category in Muay Thai at the 2013 Asian Indoor and Martial Arts Games.

On October 24, 2015, Duy Nhất defeated Victor Pinto (younger brother of Antoine Pinto) at THAI FIGHT Vietnam by decision.

On September 23, 2017, Nguyễn Trần Duy Nhất fought at the inaugural Asia Fighting Championship event, where he defeated Huang Guang Wan by second-round technical knockout.

He appeared at Asia Fighting Championship again, this time fighting Zhao Zhan Shi on September 21, 2018. After three rounds, Duy Nhất was awarded the unanimous decision victory.

ONE Championship
Nguyễn Trần Duy Nhất made his ONE Championship debut at ONE Championship: Immortal Triumph on September 6, 2019. It was ONE's first event ever held in Vietnam and the first event to feature all-striking matches. He faced Azwan Che Wil of Malaysia, whom he knocked out in the third round.

On November 22, 2019, he faced Yuta Watanabe at ONE Championship: Edge Of Greatness, where he won with via second-round head kick knockout.

Lethwei career
In 2019, Nguyễn Trần Duy Nhất signed to the World Lethwei Championship to start fighting in Lethwei.

On February 22, 2019, Duy Nhất made his lethwei debut at WLC 7: Mighty Warriors, where he defeated Pich Mtes Khmang by knockout at 2:13 of the first round.

On August 2, 2019, he returned to World Lethwei Championship at WLC 9: King of Nine Limbs, where he defeated Izat Zaki by unanimous decision.

Titles
2022 Muaythai Grand Prix Champion
5× World Muaythai Federation Champion 
2018 Uni Super Championship Tournament Champion 
 2022 World Games Muay Thai Men's 57 kg Gold Medalist
 2021 SEA Games Muay Thai Men's 60 kg Gold Medalist
 2019 IFMA World Muaythai Championships Men's 60kg Bronze Medalist 
 2017 SEA Games Muay Thai Men's 57kg Bronze Medalist
 2016 Asian Beach Games Muay Thai Men's Featherweight Gold Medalist 
 2014 Asian Beach Games Muay Thai Men's Featherweight Gold Medalist 
 2013 Asian Indoor and Martial Arts Games Men's Featherweight Gold Medalist
 2013 SEA Games Muay Thai Men's 60kg Bronze Medalist 
 2009 SEA Games Muay Thai Men's Featherweight Silver Medalist
 2009 Asian Martial Arts Games Men's Featherweight Silver Medalist

Lethwei record 

|-
|-  style="background:#cfc;"
| 2019-08-02|| Win ||align=left| Izat Zaki || WLC 9: King of Nine Limbs || Mandalay, Myanmar || Decision (unanimous) || 5 || 3:00  
|-
|-  style="background:#cfc;"
| 2019-02-22|| Win ||align=left| Pich Mtes Khmang || WLC 7: Mighty Warriors || Mandalay, Myanmar || KO || 1 || 2:13  
|-
| colspan=9 | Legend:

Muaythai record 

|- style="background:#cfc;"
| 2022-29-12|| Win ||align=left| Anon Rachvicha ||  |2022 in Muay Thai Grand Prix - The Home Coming  ||  Ho Chi Minh city, Vietnam || Decision || 3 ||  3:00
|-  style="background:#FFBBBB;" 
| 2022-06-25|| Loss ||align=left| Khim Bora ||  | 2022 in Town TV Cambodia: IPCC Kun Khmer || Svay Rieng, Cambodia || Unanimous Decision || 3 || 3:00
|-
|-  style="background:#cfc;"
| 2019-11-22|| Win ||align=left| Yuta Watanabe ||  |ONE Championship: Edge Of Greatness || Kallang, Singapore || KO (head kick) || 2 || 0:30 
|-
|-  style="background:#cfc;"
| 2019-09-06|| Win||align=left| Azwan Che Wil || ONE Championship: Immortal Triumph || Ho Chi Minh City, Vietnam || KO (punch) || 3 || 2:45  
|-
|-  style="background:#cfc;"
| 2019-08-17|| Win||align=left| Sumata Khannonthan ||  || Hanoi, Vietnam || Decision || 3 || 3:00 
|-
|-  style="background:#cfc;"
| 2018-12-23|| Win ||align=left| Phimwong Kitti || Uni Super Championship || Ho Chi Minh City, Vietnam || Decision || 3 || 3:00 
|-
! style=background:white colspan=9 |
|-  style="background:#cfc;"
| 2018-09-21|| Win ||align=left| Zhao Zhan Shi || Asia Fighting Championship 2 || Kuala Lumpur, Malaysia || Decision (unanimous) || 3 || 3:00 
|-
|-  style="background:#cfc;"
| 2017-09-23|| Win||align=left| Huang Guang Wan || Asia Fighting Championship 1 || Singapore || TKO (low kicks) || 2 || 1:19  
|-
|-  style="background:#c5d2ea;"
| 2016-12-05 || Draw ||align=left| Arthur Meyer  || King Rama 9 Memorial || Bangkok, Thailand || Decision || 3 || 3:00
|-  style="background:#cfc;"
| 2015-10-24|| Win||align=left| Victor Pinto || THAI FIGHT Vietnam || Ho Chi Minh City, Vietnam || Decision || 3 || 3:00
|-  style="background:#cfc;"
| 2012-03-21 || Win ||align=left| Mathias Gallo Cassarino  || WMF Pro-am World Championship Semifinal || Bangkok, Thailand || Decision || 3 || 3:00
|-
| colspan=9 | Legend:    

|-  style="background:#cfc;"
| 2022-07-17|| Win||align=left| Almaz Sarsembekov ||IFMA at the 2022 World Games, Final|| Birmingham, Alabama, United States || Decision (29:28)|| 3 ||3:00 
|-
! style=background:white colspan=9 |

|-  style="background:#cfc;"
| 2022-07-16|| Win ||align=left| Vladyslav Mykytas ||IFMA at the 2022 World Games, Semi Finals|| Birmingham, Alabama, United States || Decision (29:28) || 3 ||3:00

|-  style="background:#cfc;"
| 2022-07-15||Win||align=left| Rui Botelho ||IFMA at the 2022 World Games, Quarter Finals|| Birmingham, Alabama, United States || Decision (30:27) || 3 ||3:00

|-  style="background:#cfc;"
| 2022-05-22|| Win||align=left| Chonlawit Preedasak ||IFMA at the 2021 Southeast Asian Games, Final|| Hanoi, Vietnam || ||  || 
|-
! style=background:white colspan=9 |

|-  style="background:#cfc;"
| 2022-05-20|| Win||align=left| Fritz Biagtan ||IFMA at the 2021 Southeast Asian Games, Semi Final|| Hanoi, Vietnam || Decision (30:27) ||  3|| 3:00

|-  style="background:#fbb;"
| 2021-12-07 || Loss||align=left| Florent Louis Joseph || 2021 IFMA World Championships, Firs Round || Bangkok, Thailand || Decision (29:28)||3||3:00

|-  bgcolor="#fbb"
| 2019-07-26 || Loss||align=left| Sercan Koc || 2019 IFMA World Championships, Semi Final|| Bangkok, Thailand || Decision (30:27)|| 3 || 3:00
|-
! style=background:white colspan=9 |

|-  bgcolor="#CCFFCC"
| 2019-07-25 || Win||align=left| Saif Zakzook || 2019 IFMA World Championships, Quarter Final|| Bangkok, Thailand || Decision (30:27) || 3 ||3:00

|-  bgcolor="#CCFFCC"
| 2019-07-24 || Win||align=left| Kim Falk || 2019 IFMA World Championships, Second Round|| Bangkok, Thailand || RSCO|| 1 ||

|-  bgcolor="#CCFFCC"
| 2019-07-23 || Win||align=left| Argen Kerimbekov || 2019 IFMA World Championships, First Round|| Bangkok, Thailand || RSCO|| 1 ||

|-  bgcolor="#fbb"
| 2019-04-30 || Loss ||align=left| Lorenzo Sammartino || 2019 Arafura Games, Semi Finals|| Bangkok, Thailand ||Decision (29:28)|| 3 ||3:00
|-
! style=background:white colspan=9 |

|-  bgcolor="#cfc"
| 2019-04-29 || Win||align=left| Lee Fook || 2019 Arafura Games, Quarter Finals|| Bangkok, Thailand || Decision (29:28)|| 3 ||3:00

|-  bgcolor="#fbb"
| 2018-05-12 || Loss||align=left| Elvin Cruz || 2018 IFMA World Championships, First Round|| Cancun, Mexico || DQ|| 1 ||

|-  style="background:#cfc;"
| 2017-05-11|| Win ||align=left| Murat Arslan || 2017 IFMA World Championships, Final || Minsk, Belarus || Decision (30:27) || 3 || 3:00
|-
! style=background:white colspan=9 |

|-  style="background:#cfc;"
| 2017-05-10|| Win ||align=left| Artsem Vinnik || 2017 IFMA World Championships, Semi Final || Minsk, Belarus || Decision (30:27) || 3 || 3:00

|-  style="background:#cfc;"
| 2017-05-07|| Win ||align=left| Anass Hibaoui || 2017 IFMA World Championships, Quarter Final || Minsk, Belarus || Decision (29:28) || 3 || 3:00

|-  style="background:#cfc;"
| 2017-05-05|| Win ||align=left| Tolga Atanasov || 2017 IFMA World Championships, First Round || Minsk, Belarus || Decision (30:27) || 3 || 3:00

|-  style="background:#cfc;"
| 2016-09-26|| Win ||align=left| Wang Wenfeng || 2016 Asian Beach Games, Final || Da Nang, Vietnam || Decision (30:27) || 3 || 3:00
|-
! style=background:white colspan=9 |

|-  style="background:#cfc;"
| 2016-09-25|| Win ||align=left| Ahmed Abbood || 2016 Asian Beach Games, Semi Final || Da Nang, Vietnam || Decision (30:27) || 3 || 3:00

|-  style="background:#cfc;"
| 2016-09-22|| Win ||align=left| Saif Zakzook || 2016 Asian Beach Games, Quarter Final || Da Nang, Vietnam || Decision (29:28) || 3 || 3:00

|-  style="background:#cfc;"
| 2014-11-22|| Win ||align=left| Nurym Kemal || 2014 Asian Beach Games, Final || Phuket, Thailand || Decision (5-0) || 3 || 3:00
|-
! style=background:white colspan=9 |

|-  style="background:#cfc;"
| 2014-11-21|| Win ||align=left| Yasin Ahmadi || 2014 Asian Beach Games, Semi Final || Phuket, Thailand || Decision (5-0) || 3 || 3:00

|-  style="background:#cfc;"
| 2014-11-19|| Win ||align=left| Baatarchuluuny Gantogtokh || 2014 Asian Beach Games, Quarter Final || Phuket, Thailand || Decision (5-0) || 3 || 3:00

|-  bgcolor="#fbb"
| 2014-05- || Loss||align=left| Thoetkiat Suwat || 2014 IFMA World Championships, First Round|| Langkawi, Malaysia || ||  ||

|-  style="background:#cfc;"
| 2013-07-02|| Win ||align=left| Daniiar Kashkaraev || 2013 Asian Indoor and Martial Arts Games, Final || Incheon, South Korea || Decision (5-0) || 3 || 3:00
|-
! style=background:white colspan=9 |

|-  style="background:#cfc;"
| 2013-07-01|| Win ||align=left| Mohd Ali Yaakub || 2013 Asian Indoor and Martial Arts Games, Semi Final || Incheon, South Korea || Decision (5-0) || 3 || 3:00

|-  style="background:#cfc;"
| 2013-06-30|| Win ||align=left|  Faruh Haitow || 2013 Asian Indoor and Martial Arts Games, Quarter Final || Incheon, South Korea || RSCB ||  ||

|-
| colspan=9 | Legend:

References

External links

Nguyen Tran Duy Nhat at ONE Championship
Nguyen Tran Duy Nhat at World Lethwei Championship

Living people
Lightweight kickboxers
Vietnamese Lethwei practitioners
Featherweight kickboxers
Vietnamese Muay Thai practitioners
People from Nha Trang
1989 births
Southeast Asian Games silver medalists for Vietnam
Southeast Asian Games bronze medalists for Vietnam
ONE Championship kickboxers
World Games gold medalists